War Nation is the second studio album by the Tucker/Evans Tank (eighth if counting the albums by the original Tank), released through Metal Mind Productions on 5 June 2012.

Reception

Since its release, this album has been met with mostly positive reviews from critics. Music Enthusiast Magazine wrote: "When it comes to such nearly perfectionistic records, I hate to generalize. But overall, War Nation is a simply incredible album, even though there’s nothing simplistic about it".

Track listing

 "War Nation" - 6:10
 "Song of the Dead" - 5:06
 "Hammer and Nails" - 4:54
 "Don't Dream in the Dark" - 4:53
 "Grace of God" - 4:54
 "Dreamer" - 5:25
 "Justice for All" - 4:16
 "Wings of Heaven" - 5:32
 "State of the Union" - 3:59
 "Hard Road" - 3:52

Personnel
Tank
 Doogie White - vocals
 Cliff Evans - guitar
 Mick Tucker - guitar
 Chris Dale - bass
 Steve Hopgood - drums

References

2012 albums
Tank (band) albums